ORBX.js is a JavaScript library codec able to stream video in any HTML5-compliant browser. The project is a partnership between Mozilla and OTOY.

See also

PDF.js

References

Cross-platform free software
Firefox
Free video codecs
Free web software
JavaScript libraries